Justice Pankaj Mithal (born  17 June 1961) is a Judge of the Supreme Court of India. He is the former Chief Justice of the Rajasthan High Court. Previously, he has also served as the Chief Justice of the Jammu & Kashmir and Ladakh High Court and Judge of the Allahabad High Court.

Early life and education

He was born in Meerut, Uttar Pradesh on 17 June 1961 into a family of lawyers. He received his early education at St. Mary's Academy, Meerut, which is affiliated to the Indian School Certificate (I.S.C.) Board. He joined B.Com. (Honours) at the  University of Allahabad and graduated in 1982. Later he joined Meerut College, for his legal studies and obtained his law degree from Chaudhary Charan Singh University, Meerut. He is now living in Allahabad, Uttar Pradesh.

Family history 

His grand-father Babu Brij Nath Mithal  was a lawyer of western U.P. He was the Honorary Head of the law department at the Meerut College. The Boys Hostel of the law department at Meerut College, was named 'B.N.M. Hostel' (Brij Nath Mithal Hostel) in his honour.

His uncle Sri Raghuvar Dayal Mithal (1910-1981) and the eldest son of Brij Nath Mithal was also a stalwart of the Meerut Bar who dominated the civil side for over four decades. He was offered Judgeship of the High Court of Judicature at Allahabad twice but he declined it for personal reasons.

His father, Justice Narendra Nath Mithal (6 April 1930 – 7 April 1996) was also a leading civil lawyer of the District Court, Meerut. He served as the District Government Counsel (Civil) for several years before being elevated to the Bench at the High Court of Judicature at Allahabad in the year 1978. He was amongst the few persons who were directly elevated to the Bench from the District Bar. He served as a Judge of  High Court of Judicature at Allahabad from 14 December 1978 to 8 April 1992.

Career 

He was enrolled in the Bar Council of Uttar Pradesh in the year 1985 and started practicing at the High Court as an advocate. In his initial days he worked under the guidance of Sri Sudhir Chandra Verma, (later Judge of the Allahabad High Court and then Lokayukt, Uttar Pradesh). He mainly practiced on the civil side and dealt with a large number of cases of land acquisition, rent control, educational, labour and other misc. matters including service and constitution.

He served as the Standing Counsel for the Uttar Pradesh Awas Evam Vikas Parishad and Dr. B.R. Ambedkar University, Agra. He was elevated to the Bench as an Additional Judge on 7 July 2006 and was later made a permanent Judge of the High Court of Judicature at Allahabad on 2 July 2008. He was instrumental in revising the quota of work for the subordinate judiciary of U.P. as Chairman of that Committee. He was member of the Sub-Committee on Coins and Postage Stamps of the Sesquicentennial Committee which oversaw the release of a set of two stamps with the pictures of buildings of the Allahabad High Court and the Lucknow Bench of the Allahabad High Court and issuance of a set of commemorative coins of Rs.150/- Coin and Rs.5/- with the logo of the High Court by the President of India on 13 March 2016 during the inaugural ceremony of the Sesquicentennial celebrations of the High Court. He also remained posted as senior Judge, Lucknow Bench of the Allahabad High Court for some time. He worked as Chairman State Advisory Board under the National Security Act while posted at Lucknow. He was the Chairman of La Martinière College, Lucknow (both boys' and girls' wings). He was elevated as Chief Justice of Jammu & Kashmir and Ladakh High Court on 4 January 2021. He was transferred as Chief Justice of Rajasthan High Court on 14 October 2022.

His Excellency the Governor of Uttar Pradesh nominated Justice Mithal twice as a member of the Executive Council of Mahatma Gandhi Kashi Vidhyapith, Varanasi and presently her excellency the Governor of U.P. has nominated him as the member of the Executive Council of Choudhary Charan Singh University, Meerut.

He is also a trustee of Etawah Hindi Sewa Nidhi founded and promoted by Justice Late Prem Shankar Gupta for the promotion of Hindi and other Indian languages.

He was elevated as Judge of Supreme Court of India on 6 February 2023.

References

External links 
 Profile of Justice Pankaj Mithal

20th-century Indian judges
1961 births
Living people
University of Allahabad alumni
Chaudhary Charan Singh University alumni
Indian solicitors
Judges of the Allahabad High Court
https://www.livelaw.in/news-updates/chief-justice-pankaj-mithal-jammu-kashmir-high-court-oath-taking-ceremony-167944